A canton is a type of administrative division of a country.  In general, cantons are relatively small in terms of area and population when compared with other administrative divisions such as counties, departments, or provinces. Internationally, the most politically important cantons are the Swiss cantons. As the constituents of the Swiss Confederation, theoretically and historically, they are semi-sovereign states.

The term is derived from the French word canton, meaning "corner" or "district" (from which "cantonment" is also derived).

In specific countries 
Cantons exist or previously existed in the following countries:
Cantons of Belgium
Cantonal Government of Bohol
Cantons of Bolivia
Cantons of Bosnia and Herzegovina: federal units of the Federation of Bosnia and Herzegovina
Canada: Canadian French equivalent for the English word "township", since the translation municipalité is already used for a different level of government (see township).
Cantons of Quebec
Cantons of Costa Rica: national second order subdivision of the first order Provinces. Cantons are further subdivided into the third order Districts. Each canton has its own municipality, or local government.
Cantons of Ecuador: subdivisions below the provinces of Ecuador.
Cantons of El Salvador: divisions of a municipality outside the more urban caserios, which border the town or city. Cantones can be thought as the more rural parts of a city or town, generally far from the actual urban population.
Cantons of France: a subdivision of arrondissements and départements, grouping several communes.
Cantons of Lebanon: unofficial militias and factions during the Lebanese Civil War and afterwards. Most areas have been returned to Lebanese government control.
Cantons of Luxembourg: first order administrative subdivisions
Cantonal Government of Negros: short-lived provisional government in the Visayas during the Filipino-American Wars in the 19th–20th centuries Republic of Negros.
Cantons of Rojava (Western Kurdistan, Syria)
Cantons of Switzerland: each a semi-sovereign state within Switzerland.
Cantons of Togo: Subdivisions of Togo's prefectures, and further divided into villages.
subdivisions of vingtaines in Jersey
subdivisions of the parishes of Guernsey

In former countries 
Cantons of Prussia: military enrollment districts between 1733 and 1813
 Cantons of Eastern Rumelia, the subdivisions below the departments.
Cantons of the Soviet Union, subdivisions of several autonomous regions of the country before 1941.
In the Republic of New Granada, cantons were subdivisions below the provinces.
In 1873, "Cantonalists" took over the city of Cartagena, Spain, a haven for the Spanish Navy, and declared the city independent (see Cantonal Revolution).

References 

Types of administrative division